María Ester Alonzo Morales (born 15 January 1959) is a Mexican politician from the Institutional Revolutionary Party. She served as Deputy of the LXI Legislature of the Mexican Congress representing Yucatán, and previously served as municipal president of Progreso.

References

1959 births
Living people
Politicians from Yucatán (state)
Women members of the Chamber of Deputies (Mexico)
Members of the Chamber of Deputies (Mexico) for Yucatán
Institutional Revolutionary Party politicians
21st-century Mexican politicians
21st-century Mexican women politicians
Municipal presidents in Yucatán (state)
Deputies of the LXI Legislature of Mexico
Deputies of the LXIV Legislature of Mexico